La rebelión is a Mexican thriller streaming television series written by Adriana Pelusi, and is produced by Elefantec Global. The series stars Aracely Arámbula, Daniela Vega, Ana Serradilla and Adriana Paz.

It premiered on Vix+ on 17 November 2022.

Premise 
Four women decide to leave their homes unexpectedly without telling anyone their whereabouts, to rebel against their marriages and their lives as housewives that did not turn out as they thought. However, in addition to the trip, a murder will bring their lives together.

Cast

Main 
 Aracely Arámbula as Mónica
 Macarena García as Young Mónica
 Daniela Vega as Jana
 Macarena Oz as Young Jana
 Ana Serradilla as Alejandra
 Adriana Paz as Ivonne
 Alejandro de la Madrid as Mauricio
 Blanca Guerra
 Dalexa Meneses as Regina
 Ricardo Kleinbaum
 Manuel Villegas as Diego

Recurring and guest stars 
 Luis Arrieta as Roberto
 Arap Bethke
 Mariana Rendón
 Clementina Guadarrama
 Matilde Castañeda as Tatiana
 Erik Guecha
 Sergio Bonilla

Production 
In August 2021, the series was announced as La rebelión de las esposas, being one of the titles to be produced by Pantaya and Elefantec Global. On 7 January 2022, filming of the series began in Mexico City, with the title being changed to simply La rebelión. On 14 January 2022, Aracely Arámbula, Daniela Vega, Ana Serradilla and Adriana Paz were cast in the lead roles. On 29 October 2022, it was announced that the series would premiere on Vix+, following TelevisaUnivision's acquisition of Pantaya a month prior. On 10 November 2022, Vix released an official trailer for the series.

Episodes

References

External links 
 

2020s Mexican television series
2022 Mexican television series debuts
Vix (streaming service) original programming
Spanish-language television shows
Mexican drama television series